Christopher Jeffrey (born November 19, 1988) is a Canadian curler from Halifax, Nova Scotia. He currently plays the alternate on Team Scott Jones.

Career

Men's
In his junior career, Jeffrey played in the 2007 Canadian Junior Curling Championships, finishing with a 4–8 record.

Jeffrey made the provincial final in 2013 playing third for Zach Eldridge. They lost to James Grattan by one point. He won his first Tankard title in 2015 at the 2015 Pepsi Tankard as second for Jeremy Mallais and they went on to have a 2–9 record at the 2015 Tim Hortons Brier in Calgary. He joined the Grattan rink for the 2017–18 season and the move paid off for him as the team won the 2018 Papa John's Pizza Tankard. At the 2018 Tim Hortons Brier, they finished with a 3–5 record. They won the tankard once again in 2020 and finished with a 3–4 record at the 2020 Tim Hortons Brier.

Mixed doubles
Jeffrey teamed up with Jaclyn Tingley for the 2019 New Brunswick Mixed Doubles Championship. They made the semifinals where they lost to eventual winners Leah Thompson and Charlie Sullivan. They also competed at the 2020 championship but failed to qualify for the playoffs.

For the 2021 provincial championship, Jeffrey teamed up with Katie Forward. The team lost out in the qualification round.

Personal life
Jeffrey is married and works as a senior engineer at Teck Resources Limited.

Teams

References

External links

Curlers from New Brunswick
Living people
Sportspeople from Moncton
1988 births
Canadian male curlers
Sportspeople from Fredericton
Sportspeople from Halifax, Nova Scotia